Fernando Luis Bersano (born 3 January 1998) is an Argentine professional footballer who plays as a left-back for Gimnasia Mendoza, on loan from Talleres.

Career
Bersano began his career with Deportivo y Cultural Arroyito, who preceded his move to Talleres. He was promoted into the Primera División club's first-team squad midway through the 2018–19 season, though he had signed his first pro contract back in November 2016. Having impressed in mid-season friendlies in January 2019, the defender signed a new two-year contract on 24 January. He made his professional debut under manager Juan Pablo Vojvoda on 27 January during an away draw to Independiente; he featured for the full duration.

In February 2021, Bersano was sent out on loan to Primera Nacional club Villa Dálmine until the end of the year. After returning in January 2022, he was sent out on loan again, this time to Deportivo Morón, until the end of 2022. However, the spell at Morón was terminated before time, and joined Gimnasia Mendoza on 23 June 2022, on a one-year loan.

Career statistics
.

References

External links

1998 births
Living people
Sportspeople from Córdoba Province, Argentina
Argentine footballers
Association football defenders
Argentine Primera División players
Primera Nacional players
Talleres de Córdoba footballers
Villa Dálmine footballers
Deportivo Morón footballers
Gimnasia y Esgrima de Mendoza footballers